Dokumenta may mean:
 the Rheinische Dokumenta, a phonetic writing system of West German Platt languages
 Documenta, a modern art exhibition held in Kassel, Germany every 5 years, as per a common misspelling
 Documents, in various languages